The Men's 110 metres hurdles event at the 2011 European Athletics U23 Championships was held in Ostrava, Czech Republic, at Městský stadion on 15 and 16 July.

Medalists

Results

Final
16 July 2011 / 18:50
Wind: -0.4 m/s

Semifinals
Qualified: First 3 in each heat (Q) and 2 best performers (q) advance to the Final

Summary

Details

Semifinal 1
16 July 2011 / 17:30
Wind: -0.8 m/s

Semifinal 2
16 July 2011 / 17:37
Wind: -0.9 m/s

Heats
Qualified: First 3 in each heat (Q) and 4 best performers (q) advance to the Semifinals

Summary

Details

Heat 1
15 July 2011 / 10:45
Wind: -0.3 m/s

Heat 2
15 July 2011 / 10:52
Wind: -0.6 m/s

Heat 3
15 July 2011 / 10:59
Wind: -0.9 m/s

Heat 4
15 July 2011 / 11:06
Wind: -1.4 m/s

Participation
According to an unofficial count, 26 athletes from 17 countries participated in the event.

References

110 metres hurdles
Sprint hurdles at the European Athletics U23 Championships